The Filmfare Best Music Director Award is given to film composers by the Filmfare magazine as part of its annual Filmfare Awards South for Tamil  (Kollywood) films.         A. R. Rahman is the most frequent winner with sixteen wins, which also includes nine consecutive wins between 1992 and 2000. Harris Jayaraj follows A. R. Rahman with five wins.

Superlatives & Multiple wins

Multiple wins :

16 wins :A. R. Rahman
5 wins :Harris Jayaraj
2 wins :Bharadwaj, G V Prakash Kumar
1 win:Anirudh Ravichander, Illayaraja, D. Imman

Winners

Nominations

2000s
2001 Harris Jayaraj for Minnale
 Ilayaraja – Kasi
 S. A. Rajkumar – Aanandham
2003 Harris Jayaraj for Kaakha Kaakha
 A. R. Rahman – Boys
 Harris Jayaraj – Saamy
 Ilayaraja – Pithamagan
 Vidhyasagar – Dhool
2007 A. R. Rahman for Sivaji
 A. R. Rahman – Azhagiya Tamil Magan
 Harris Jayaraj – Unnale Unnale
 Vijay Antony – Naan Avanillai
 Yuvan Shankar Raja – Paruthiveeran
 2008 Harris Jayaraj – Vaaranam Aayiram
 A. R. Rahman – Sakkarakatti
 James Vasanthan – Subramaniyapuram
 Vijay Antony – Kadhalil Vizhunthen
 Yuvan Shankar Raja – Yaaradi Nee Mohini
 2009 Harris Jayaraj – Ayan
 Devi Sri Prasad – Kanthaswamy
 Devi Sri Prasad – Villu
 Harris Jayaraj – Aadhavan
 Vidyasagar – Kanden Kadhalai

2010s
 2010 A. R. Rahman – Vinnaithaandi Varuvaayaa
 A. R. Rahman – Enthiran
 G. V. Prakash Kumar – Aayirathil Oruvan
 G. V. Prakash Kumar – Madarasapattinam
 Yuvan Shankar Raja – Naan Mahan Alla
 Yuvan Shankar Raja – Paiyaa
 2011 G. V. Prakash Kumar – Aadukalam
G. V. Prakash Kumar – Deiva Thirumagal
Ghibran – Vaagai Sooda Vaa
Harris Jayaraj – 7aum Arivu
Harris Jayaraj – Ko
 2012 D. Imman – Kumki
 Anirudh Ravichander – 3
 G. V. Prakash Kumar – Thandavam
 Harris Jayaraj – Thuppakki
 Ilaiyaraaja – Neethane En Ponvasantham
2013 – A. R. Rahman – Kadal
 A. R. Rahman – Maryan
 Anirudh Ravichander – Ethir Neechal
 Anirudh Ravichander – Vanakkam Chennai
 D. Imman – Varuthapadatha Valibar Sangam
 G. V. Prakash Kumar – Paradesi
2014 – Anirudh Ravichander – Velaiyilla Pattathari
 A. R. Rahman – Kaaviya Thalaivan
 Anirudh Ravichander – Kaththi
 Anirudh Ravichander – Maan Karate
 Santhosh Narayanan – Madras
2015 – A. R. Rahman – I
 A. R. Rahman – OK Kanmani
 Anirudh Ravichander – Maari
 Anirudh Ravichander – Naanum Rowdy Dhaan
 Harris Jayaraj – Yennai Arindhaal
 2016 – A. R. Rahman – Achcham Yenbadhu Madamaiyada
 A. R. Rahman – 24
 Anirudh Ravichander – Remo
 G. V. Prakash Kumar – Theri
 Harris Jayaraj – Iru Mugan
 Santhosh Narayanan – Kabali
 2017 – A. R. Rahman – Mersal
 A. R. Rahman – Kaatru Veliyidai
 Anirudh Ravichander – Velaikkaran
 Anirudh Ravichander – Vivegam
 D. Imman – Bogan
 2018 – Govind Vasantha – 96
 A. R. Rahman – Chekka Chivantha Vaanam
 Anirudh Ravichander – Kolamavu Kokila
 Santhosh Narayanan – Pariyerum Perumal
 Yuvan Shankar Raja – Pyaar Prema Kaadhal
2020-2021 – G. V. Prakash Kumar – Soorarai Pottru 
Anirudh Ravichander – Darbar 
Anirudh Ravichander – Doctor
Anirudh Ravichander – Master 
D. Imman – Annaatthe 
Leon James – Oh My Kadavule

References

External links
52nd Annual Awards

Music Director
Film awards for Best Music Director